Bjåen or Bjåi is a small village in Bykle municipality in Agder county, Norway. The village is located along the Norwegian National Road 9 (the road may be closed in winter, due to heavy snow and bad weather). The area is primarily agricultural, specializing in sheep herding rather than growing crops, but Bjåen is probably best known for the Bjåen tourist lodge in the high mountain area.

References

Villages in Agder
Setesdal
Bykle